A digital marketing system (DMS) is a method of centralized channel distribution used primarily by SaaS products. It combines a content management system (CMS) with data centralization and syndication across the web, mobile, scannable surface, and social channels.

Web 

A DMS publishes to web channels, usually in the form of a stand-alone website. It can manage any part of the web process, including web design, web hosting, domain registering, marketing, content creation and other standard methods of web promotion. The goal of web publication is to give the user a digital 'home' on the web, where clients, guests, fans and other web browsers arrive as a destination. Other methods of digital marketing often work to drive traffic to the web channel.

An example of a SaaS DMS services is HubSpot.

Social 

A DMS publishes to popular social channels, including Facebook, Twitter and Instagram in orer to drive traffic to the user's website. The publication can be in the form of text, images, or videos.

Privacy issues 
Digital marketing is considered a challenge for privacy because consumers' information is searched, collected, and used in the process of digital marketing without consumers' awareness. The privacy of customers is important because that it is related to customers' perceived value, satisfaction, loyalty, their trust in a company and the performance of a company.

Types of information 

Basic information：

In the traditional sense, private information mainly includes gender, age, educational background, marital status and other basic information.

In the network society, private information also includes personalized digital information such as account passwords.

Activity information：

Private information refers to browsing history, purchasing records, location, social activities and so on

Illegal use of information 
At present, the discussion on the consequences of privacy issues caused by digital marketing technology is increasingly focused on the possibility of illegal use of information. The information of consumers may become commodities, which will be exchanged or traded without the consumer's awareness and authorization.

The consumers' information is mainly exchanged or transacted in two forms. 
One is that the related merchants share those data. The other is that those data are sold by certain recommenders to a third party. For example, the data that can identify the financial status of consumers is very attractive to credit agencies. All of these above increases the risk of consumer privacy.

Customer attitude
Some customers tend to choose the latter between a right to privacy and other favourable conditions. Pieces of evidence show that some customers are willing to allow merchants to use their personal information if they can have something to gain in return, even just small rewards, even though they do worry about their privacy may be invaded. In addition, digital marketing provide convenience to people. In the minds of some customers, this convenience is more important than their privacy, especially for teens. Nevertheless, most people are very concerned about whether their privacy is protected.

Supervision and administration
Permission marketing is a system where consumers can grant licenses only to a few merchants which are chosen from a large number of merchants. Merchants can also post privacy logs to promote transparency and accountability.

The General Data Protection Regulation (GDPR) is an example which meets the above requirements. It stipulates that merchants can collect customers' information only for specific, clear and legitimate purposes and deal with them only in a fair, transparent, and legal manner and merchants must protect this data. Customers should be informed that how will their data be used, what will be the effects and other relevant information in a concise, easy-to-understand and freeway so that they can determine whether it is necessary to grant authorization or not. Except the right to be informed, the GDPR also provide customers with seven other rights such as the right of access, the right to erasure, the right to restrict processing, the right to object and establishes corresponding accountability system.

References

Content management systems
Information systems
Website management
Digital marketing